Muttathu Varkey Award for contributions to the field of Malayalam literature is instituted by the Muttattu Varkey Foundation in memory of novelist Muttathu Varkey. The award was instituted in 1992 and as of 2012, it carries a purse of 50000, a citation, and a statuette. The awards are usually announced on 28 April (the birth anniversary of Varkey) and presented on 28 May (the death anniversary of Varkey) every year.

The award was instituted as a recognition of the writer's (particularly novelists) body of work rather than any one title. In 2015, K. Satchidanandan became the first poet to be selected for the award. The year 2015 was the 75th anniversary of Muttathu Varkey’s debut into Malayalam literature with a poem titled ‘‘Aathmanjali’’ and so it was decided to have the award be given to poetry. In 2016 and 2017, the award was given for screenplay writing and notably in recognition for a particular work unlike previous years.

Awardees

References

Indian literary awards
Awards established in 1992
Malayalam literary awards
Kerala awards
1992 establishments in Kerala